Te Akeake railway station was a station on the Opua Branch in New Zealand.

The station opened in about 1888 and closed on 14 August 1931.

References

Defunct railway stations in New Zealand
Railway stations opened in 1888
Railway stations closed in 1931
Rail transport in the Northland Region
Buildings and structures in the Northland Region